Lofiskos is a village and a community of the Lagkadas municipality. Before the 2011 local government reform it was part of the municipality of Vertiskos, of which it was a municipal district. The 2011 census recorded 261 inhabitants in the village and 447 inhabitants in the community of Lofiskos. The community of Lofiskos covers an area of 52.767 km2.

Administrative division
The community of Lofiskos consists of two separate settlements: 
Areti (population 186)
Lofiskos (population 261)
The aforementioned populations are from the 2011 census.

See also
 List of settlements in the Thessaloniki regional unit

References

Populated places in Thessaloniki (regional unit)